John Thomas "The Bomb" Tracy (September 7, 1934 – January 24, 1996) was an American football running back in the National Football League for the Detroit Lions, Pittsburgh Steelers, and the Washington Redskins and in the Canadian Football League with the Ottawa Rough Riders. Tracy started his career in Canada, with 2 seasons with the Riders, where he was selected an All-Star in his rookie year. He went to two Pro Bowls and attended the University of Tennessee.

References

1934 births
1996 deaths
People from Birmingham, Michigan
American football running backs
Players of American football from Michigan
Tennessee Volunteers football players
Detroit Lions players
Pittsburgh Steelers players
Washington Redskins players
Ottawa Rough Riders players
Eastern Conference Pro Bowl players